Hin Tin is a village in the Tai Wai area of Sha Tin District, Hong Kong.

Location
Hin Tin is located south of the main part of Hin Keng Estate and across Hin Keng Street. Ha Keng Hau, Sheung Keng Hau and Hin Tin are three adjacent villages located along Hin Keng Street, along a northeast–southwest direction. Hin Keng Estate was named after them.

Administration
Hin Tin is a recognized village under the New Territories Small House Policy.

History
Hin Tin village was erected with government funding in the 1920s to resettle three clans of villagers from Shek Lei Pui Valley, to make way for the construction of the Shek Lei Pui Reservoir, completed in 1925. Some 80 people lived in 26 houses in the former Shek Lei Pui Village. The Yeung, the Law and the So were Hakkas from Nantou who had settled in the Valley for some 300 years. Another clan in the Valley, the Lau, moved to Kwai Chung instead of Hin Tin at the resettlement. The villagers who chose to settle in Hin Tin did so because they saw good income opportunities from the then surrounding forest.

In 1982, the Housing Department demolished 600 structures at Hin Tin and relocated 167 families.

Features
The ancestral halls of the three clans, Yeung, Law and So, are connected together to form a single block on the front row of the original three rows of houses. They have been listed as Grade III historic buildings since 2010.

See also
 Helen Liang Memorial Secondary School (Shatin)
 Hin Keng station
 Kau Yeuk (Sha Tin)

References

External links

 Delineation of area of existing village Hin Tin (Sha Tin) for election of resident representative (2019 to 2022)

Villages in Sha Tin District, Hong Kong
Tai Wai